Kammavaripalem is the name of a number of populated places in the Indian State of Andhra Pradesh.

These may include:
 Kammavaripalem, Guntur district
 Kammavaripalem, Krishna district
 Kammavaari palem, Nellore district
 Kammavaripalem, Prakasam district